The Democratic Republic of the Congo Davis Cup team represents the Democratic Republic of the Congo in Davis Cup tennis competition and are governed by the Fédération de la République Démocratique du Congo de Tennis. They currently compete in the Africa Zone of Group IV.

History
The Democratic Republic of the Congo competed in its first Davis Cup in 2022. Their best result was finishing second in their Group IV pool in 2022.

Players

Recent performances
Here is the list of all match-ups of the DR Congo participation in the Davis Cup in 2022.

See also
Davis Cup

References

External links

Davis Cup teams
Davis Cup
Davis Cup